Events from the year 1628 in art.

Events
February – Gerrit Dou becomes a pupil of Rembrandt; the latter, then 22 years of age, paints a cheerful self-portrait, which will be sold 380 years later, in 2008, for 4.5 million dollars.
Willem van Haecht becomes curator of the art collection owned by Cornelis van der Geest.
Gerard van Honthorst visits the court of King Charles I of England.

Works

Nicolas Poussin – The Death of Germanicus
Rembrandt – Rembrandt's Mother: Bust (etching)
Francisco de Zurbarán – Saint Serapion
Cornelis van Haarlem – The Judgement of Paris (approximate date)
Anthony van Dyck
Nicolas Lanier
The Shepherd Paris (approximate date)
Diego Velázquez – Portrait of the Infanta Maria of Austria (approximate date)

Births
January 6 - Balthazard Marsy, French sculptor (died 1674)
March 17 – François Girardon, French sculptor (died 1715)
April 22 – Georg Matthäus Vischer, cartographer, topographer and engraver (died 1696)
May 15 – Carlo Cignani, Italian painter of the Bolognese school (died 1719)
August – Pedro de Mena, Spanish sculptor (died 1688)
December 25 – Noël Coypel, French painter (died 1707)
date unknown
Jan Pieter Brueghel, Flemish Baroque painter (died 1664)
Guillaume Courtois, French painter and etcher (died 1679)
Biagio Falcieri, Italian painter of the Baroque era (died 1703)
Prosper Henricus Lankrink, Flemish painter (died 1692)
Heinrich Meyring, German sculptor (died 1723)
Andrea Suppa, Italian painter of marine landscapes (died 1671)
Giovanni Battista Venanzi, Italian painter of churches in the Baroque period (d. unknown)
probable
Jacob Isaakszoon van Ruisdael, Dutch landscape painter (died 1682)
1628/1629: Herman van Aldewereld, Dutch portrait painter (died 1669)

Deaths
January 14 – Francisco Ribalta, Spanish painter, mostly of religious subjects (born 1565)
October – Juan Ribalta, Spanish painter, son of Francisco Ribalta (born 1597)
October 14 - Palma il Giovane, Italian Mannerist painter from Venice (born 1548/1550)
date unknown
Hans Collaert, Flemish engraver and draughtsman (born 1545)
Baldassare Croce, Italian academic painter and director of the Accademia di San Luca (born 1558)
Bartolomé de Cárdenas, Spanish painter (born 1575)
Giacomo Locatelli, Italian painter born at Verona (born 1580)
Jan Harmensz. Muller, Dutch painter (born 1571)
Küplüceli Öznur, Ottoman Turkish Divan poet and calligrapher (born 1526)
Ding Yunpeng, Chinese painter especially of human figures and landscapes (born 1547)
1628/1629: Johannes Bosschaert, member of the Bosschaert family of still life painters (born 1606/1608)
1628/1629: Simon Frisius, Dutch engraver (born 1570-75)
1628/1632: Rafael Sadeler I, Flemish engraver of the Sadeler family (born 1560/1561)

 
Years of the 17th century in art
1620s in art